The 69th Rifle Corps was a corps of the Soviet Red Army. It was part of the 20th Army. It took part in the Great Patriotic War.

Organization 
 73rd Rifle Division
 229th Rifle Division
 233rd Rifle Division

Commanders 
 Major General Yevdokim Mogilovchik
 Major General Timofey Kruglyakov (July - November 1943)

Reference 

Rifle corps of the Soviet Union